Chile has submitted films for the Academy Award for Best International Feature Film since 1990. The award is handed out annually by the United States Academy of Motion Picture Arts and Sciences to a feature-length motion picture produced outside the United States that contains primarily non-English dialogue.

Chile has submitted twenty-six films for Oscar consideration, with their first film being nominated for an Academy Award in 2013. Chile won its first Foreign Language Oscar in 2018, with A Fantastic Woman.

Submissions
The Academy of Motion Picture Arts and Sciences has invited the film industries of various countries to submit their best film for the Academy Award for Best Foreign Language Film since 1956. The Foreign Language Film Award Committee oversees the process and reviews all the submitted films. Following this, they vote via secret ballot to determine the five nominees for the award. Below is a list of the films that have been submitted by Chile for review by the academy for the award by year and the respective Academy Awards ceremony.

The Chilean submission is selected annually by the Consejo del Arte y la Industria Audiovisual, which chooses a nominee for the Spanish Goya Awards at the same time. The Goya nominee is usually the same film as the Oscar nominee (1991, 1993, 2001, 2003, 2004, 2006, 2007, 2009) but not always (1990, 2005, 2008, 2012).

All films were made in Spanish

The 2009 race was particularly controversial in Chile when The Maid, one of the most awarded films in Chile's cinematic history, was passed over in favor of a historical drama Dawson, Island 10 by Miguel Littin. The Chilean Cultural Council released a statement in November 2009, defending the decision.

The 2020 film The Mole Agent made the shortlist for Best International Feature Film, but ended up being nominated in another category, Best Documentary Feature.

Shortlisted Films 
Since 2000, Chile has announced a list of finalists or eligible films that varied in number over the years (from 2 to 14 films) before announcing their official Oscar nominee, except in the years 2002, 2004, 2006, 2010, 2013 - 2015, 2017 and 2018 where an official list was not announced. The following films have been shortlisted by the Audiovisual Art and Industry Council, a collegiate committee of audiovisual specialists brought together by the CNCA between 2003 and 2019, and by the Chilean Film Academy from 2020:

 2000: Somewhere in the Night · Tierra del Fuego
 2001: Loco Fever
 2003: Cesante · Eternal Blood · Sex with Love
 2005: Gente decente · Juego de verano · My Best Enemy · Mujeres infieles · Time Off
 2007: Casa de Remolienda · Fiestapatria · The King of San Gregorio · Scrambled Beer · Ugly Me
 2008: 31 minutos, la película · 199 Tips to Be Happy · El brindis · Desierto sur · The Good Life · Life Kills Me · Mansacue · Microfilia · Mirageman
 2009: Christmas · El regalo · The Maid · Muñeca
 2011: Post mortem · Ulysses
 2012: Bonsái · Old Cats · Sal
 2016: Chicago Boys · The Pearl Button · El príncipe inca · No Filter · Sex Life of Plants · Talion
 2019: Dry Martina · Ema · The Man of the Future · Too Late to Die Young
 2020: Jailbreak Pact · Kill Pinochet · Lina from Lima · My Tender Matador
 2021: Bad Neighbor · Date una Vuelta en el Aire · The Eternal Moment · Fever Dream · Forgotten Roads · The Journey of Monalisa · My Brothers Dream Awake · La promesa del retorno · Superno · Tres almas · La Verónica
 2022: 130 Children · 1976 · Burning Patience · El Castigo · The Cow Who Sang a Song Into the Future · Gaucho Americano · Immersion · (Im)Patient ·  Karnawal · My Imaginary Country · A Place Called Dignity · La Provisoria · Songs of Repression

See also
List of Chilean Academy Award winners and nominees
List of Academy Award winners and nominees for Best Foreign Language Film
List of Academy Award-winning foreign language films

Notes

References

External links
The Official Academy Awards Database
The Motion Picture Credits Database
IMDb Academy Awards Page

Chile
Lists of Chilean films